Simon Johnson may refer to:

Simon Johnson (deacon) (1794–1875), Wampanoag tribal member and religious leader from Aquinnah, Massachusetts
Simon Johnson (economist) (born 1963), former chief economist of the IMF and professor at MIT's Sloan School of Management
Simon Johnson (footballer) (born 1983), footballer who began his career at Leeds United
Simon Johnson (novelist) (1874–1970), Norwegian-American novelist
Simon Johnson, member of UK group The Mercurymen
Simon Johnson, musician, composer, Master of Music at Westminster Cathedral, and former organist of St Paul's Cathedral